Charu Market is a sub-neighbourhood of Tollygunge in Kolkata, Kolkata district, West Bengal, India.

Geography

Police district
Charu Market police station is located at 28, Deshpran Sashmal Road, Kolkata-700033.

Tollygunge Women's police station has jurisdiction over all the police districts in the South Division, i.e. Park Street, Shakespeare Sarani, Alipore, Hastings, Maidan, Bhowanipore, Kalighat, Tollygunge, Charu Market, New Alipur and Chetla.

Economy

Daily markets
Charu Chandra Market at 54/1 Charu Chandra Avenue is a private road-side market spread across 0.66 acres. Vegetables, fruits, betel leaf, fish, meat, egg  and grocery are available.

References

Neighbourhoods in Kolkata